Morne Ciseaux is a town in the Anse la Raye District of the island nation of Saint Lucia.   There is also a second-order subdivision, Morne Ciseaux, that has a population of 160 in 2010.  The town is located towards the heart of the island, between Vanard and La Treille.

See also
List of cities in Saint Lucia
Districts of Saint Lucia

References

Towns in Saint Lucia